The 2000 Cincinnati Bengals season was the team's 33rd year in professional football and its 31st with the National Football League. Corey Dillon would rank fifth in the NFL with 1,435 rushing yards and set a franchise record for most rushing yards in one season. On October 22, 2000, Dillon set a franchise record by rushing for 278 yards in one game.
After being shut out in two of their first three games and a home loss to the Browns 24–7 in week 1, Coach Bruce Coslet resigned; he was replaced by former All-Pro Detroit Lions DB and Bengal defensive coordinator Dick LeBeau. Under LeBeau, the Bengals dropped their first three games, with an eventual long losing streak finally coming to an end on October 22 against the Denver Broncos at the new Paul Brown Stadium. The Bengals defeated the Broncos 31–21 as RB Corey Dillon set a single-game record by rushing for 278 yards. The Bengals used it as springboard to win their next game in Cleveland despite not scoring a touchdown. The Bengals offense would continue to struggle as 2nd year quarterback Akili Smith, the team's No. 1 draft pick out of Oregon, was overwhelmed by the NFL game. Corey Dillon set a team record by rushing for 1,435 yards, but with Smith's struggles as starting quarterback, the team floundered with a season-ending record of 4–12.

The last remaining active member of the 2000 Cincinnati Bengals was linebacker Takeo Spikes, who retired after the 2012 season.

Offseason

NFL Draft

Personnel

Roster

Regular season

Schedule 

Note: Intra-division opponents are in bold text.

Standings

Team leaders

Passing

Rushing

Receiving

Defensive

Kicking and punting

Special teams

Awards and records 
 Corey Dillon, AFC Offensive Player of the Week (Week 8) 
 Corey Dillon RB, AFC Pro-Bowl Selection
 Corey Dillon, Franchise Record, Most Rushing Yards in One Game (278 yards on October 22, 2000) 
 Corey Dillon, Franchise Record, Most Rushing Yards in One Season (1,435 rushing yards)

Milestones 
 Corey Dillon, 4th 1000 yard rushing season (1,435 rushing yards) 
 Tremain Mack, 3rd 1000-yard return season (1,036 yards)

Best performances 
 Corey Dillon, October 22, 2000, 278 rushing yards vs. the Denver Broncos
 Corey Dillon, December 3, 2000, 216 rushing yards vs. the Arizona Cardinals

References

External links 
 
 2000 Cincinnati Bengals at Pro-Football-Reference.com

Cincinnati Bengals
Cincinnati Bengals seasons
Cincin